Oak Center is an unincorporated community in Gillford Township, Wabasha County, Minnesota, United States.

Geography
The community is located between Lake City and Zumbro Falls at the junction of Wabasha County Roads 31, 75, and 82; and U.S. Highway 63. County Roads 3, 16, and 33 are also in the immediate area. Nearby places include Lake City, Zumbro Falls, Bellechester, and Mazeppa.

History
A post office was established at Oak Center in 1874, and remained in operation until 1907. The community was named for a grove of oak trees near the original town site.

References

Unincorporated communities in Minnesota
Unincorporated communities in Wabasha County, Minnesota